Rincón De Los Montes is a town in the Mexican state of Sinaloa. 

Rincon De Los Montes is a small town  from the municipality of Badiraguato. The municipality of Badiraguato reported 759 inhabitants in Rincon De Los Montes.

External links 
http://mexico.pueblosamerica.com/i/el-rincon-de-los-montes/

Populated places in Sinaloa